Santhigiri Ashram is located in Pothencode, Thiruvananthapuram District, Kerala. The ashram was founded by Navajyothi sri Karunakara Guru and is recognized and developed as a Social and Scientific Research Organization by the Government of India.

The followers of Karunakara Guru have built a monument called Parnasala  in the shape of a blooming lotus in white Makrana marble in the Ashram compound. This structure required ten years for completion. It was inaugurated by the President of India  Pratibha Devi Patil on 13 August 2010 and was opened for prayers and worship on 12 September 2010 .

Vision
Santhigiri Ashram works towards fulfilling Navajyothi Sri Karunakara Guru's vision of a revitalized life involving spiritual, social, economic and cultural elements.

Activities

Offering free food
One of Guru's objectives was to feed the poor and to this effect the ashram offers an Annadanam or gift of food, at their various centers, to all the visitors as well as inmates. On the aspects of guru's wish all human beings in one society truly followed

Healthcare
Athurasevanam or care of the ailing is a supporting function to the Guru's vision. The ashram performs this function through a chain of Ayurveda and Siddha research centers, hospitals, onsite and offsite health care programs and camps and social research.

Athmabodhanam
Part of the Guru's vision for the ashram is Athmabodhanam or spiritual awakening. The awakening is at two levels - rational and transcendental; the former focuses on elimination of ignorance while the latter focuses on knowledge of reality.

Economic development
As part of the vision of a revitalized life, the ashram focuses on economic development, with an emphasis on trade skills and support for women and cottage industry programs.

References

External links

 

Hindu temples in Thiruvananthapuram district
Ashrams
2010 establishments in Kerala
Educational institutions established in 2010